Three ships of the United States Navy have borne the name Avenger.

 , was a side-wheel ram, transferred from the Army to the Navy in 1863, and decommissioned and sold in 1865.
 , was leased and commissioned by the Navy in May 1918, and decommissioned in December 1918.
 , is an Avenger-class mine countermeasures ship, launched in 1985 and decommissioned on 30 September 2014.

Fictional ships

 The 1979 novel, Inoculate!, features a fictional submarine named USS Avenger

See also

Sources
 

United States Navy ship names